Gudda is a village in Sultanpur Lodhi tehsil in Kapurthala district of Punjab, India. The cities of Kapurthala and Sultanpur Lodhi are the district & sub-district headquarters, respectively, of the district in which Gudda village is located. The village is administrated by a Sarpanch who is an elected representative of village, as per the constitution of India and Panchayati raj (India).

Air travel connectivity 
The village's nearest international airport is Sri Guru Ram Dass Jee International Airport, located near Amritsar.

List of cities near the village 
Bhulath
Kapurthala 
Phagwara 
Sultanpur Lodhi

References

External links
 Villages in Kapurthala
 List of Villages in Kapurthala Tehsil

Villages in Kapurthala district